Sohai Ali Abro is a Pakistani actress, dancer and model, who appears in Pakistani television serials and films. She is known for her roles in serials such as Geo TV's Saat Pardon Mein (2012), Hum TV's Tanhai (2013), Khoya Khoya Chand (2013), Rishtay Kuch Adhooray Se (2013) and ARY Digital's serial Pyaray Afzal (2014). Abro made her film debut with a supporting role in the 2013 romantic drama Anjuman. Her performance earned her a nomination in the Best Supporting Actress category at Tarang Housefull Awards. Her other films include Wrong No., Jawani Phir Nahi Ani (both 2015) and Motorcycle Girl (2018), for which she received a Lux Style Award for Best Film Actress (Critic’s Choice).

Early life 
Abro was born in Larkana, Sindh, to a Sindhi family. She is the youngest of her brother and a sister. Her both parents, who were professionally medical officers, died of natural death, when Abro was still a nine-years-old.

Abro spent her younger days in Hyderabad, Sukkur and Islamabad. Eventually, she moved to Karachi, where she pursued her studies, and later her interest in the theater made her popular with prominent names in the showbiz industry.

Career 
Abro started her career as a model and has appeared in many commercials like Shan Pickle, Coca-Cola, Mobilink and Pepsi.

Abro made her acting debut with Geo TV serial Saat Pardon Mein opposite Mikaal Zulfiqar and Alyy Khan. She did a dance-performance for a reality show on ARY Digital's Naach. She also appeared in the telefilm Rangraiz Meray, which was aired on Hum TV. Later she appeared in the serial Tanhai opposite Goher Mumtaz, Ayesha Omar, Azfar Rehman, Saba Hameed and Arisha Razi, airing on Hum TV and Kyun Hai Tu opposite Mikaal Zulfiqar and Neelam Muneer which aired on Geo Kahani.

Abro made her film debut with Yasir Nawaz's Anjuman, for which she was nominated for a Tarang Housefull Awards in the Best Supporting Actress category. In 2015, she acted in two Pakistani films, Wrong No. and Jawani Phir Nahi Ani, both of which were box-office hits. In 2018, she appeared in biographical drama film Motorcycle Girl, which was based on the life of female motorcyclist Zenith Irfan. It was her first major role in a film, and she received praise from critics for her performance, with Dawn.com states ''Sohai plays the role of the disillusioned but fierce and determined young adult honestly and endearingly. She is charismatic and so, so relatable. This is her shining moment, the role she'll be remembered for.'' Although the film was a critical success, it flopped commercially. Her performance in the film earned her a Lux Style Award for Best Film Actress (Critic’s Choice).

Filmography

Awards and nominations

|-
! style="background:#bfd7ff;" colspan="4" | Tarang Houseful Awards
|-
| 2014
| Anjuman
| Best Supporting Actress
| 
|-
! style="background:#bfd7ff;" colspan="4" |ARY Film Awards
|-
| rowspan="2"| 2016
| Jawani Phir Nahi Ani
| rowspan="2" | ARY Film Award for Best Actress
| 
|-
| Wrong No.
| 
|-
! style="background:#bfd7ff;" colspan="4" |Lux Style Awards
|-
|rowspan="2"|2016
|Jawani Phir Nahi Ani
|Best Supporting Actress in a Film 
|rowspan="2" 
|-
|Wrong No.
|Best Lead Actress in a Film 
|-
|2019
|Motorcycle Girl
|Best Film Actress (Critics' choice)
|
|-
! style="background:#bfd7ff;" colspan="4" |ARY People's Choice Awards
|-
| rowspan=2|2021
|rowspan=2| Prem Gali''
|Favorite Actress in a role of Bahu
|
|-
|Favorite Jori (along with Farhan Saeed)
|
|}

References

External links 
 

Pakistani female models
Living people
Pakistani female dancers
Pakistani television actresses
Actresses from Lahore
Sindhi people
Pakistani film actresses
21st-century Pakistani actresses
Year of birth missing (living people)